Chatledo Eidi (English: Gone With A Heavy Heart) is a 2000 Indian Meitei language film directed and produced by Makhonmani Mongsaba under the banner of Sangai Films. It is based on the famous radio play Chatledo Eidi Meigee Ching Puduna by Moirangthem Inao. The film was selected for Indian Panorama of the 32nd International Film Festival of India (IFFI) 2001. The movie won the National Film Award for Best Feature Film in Manipuri at the 48th National Film Awards.

Synopsis
Sheilesh and Sandhyarani's love affair begins on a rainy day through a mutual friend Radharani. Both the lovebirds face harsh realities of life in differing ways. Sheilesh looks for new jobs and opportunities but the prevailing system of corruption never stands in favour of a simpleton like him. Sandhyarani lives under a roof where her sister-in-law becomes the main reason for their family's harmony to be constantly disturbed. Despite all the obstacles their lives have to offer, Sheilesh and Sandhyarani strive hard for a shared future. Unfortunately, they part ways and Sandhyarani leaves her paternal home with a heavy heart.

Cast 
 Nityaibi as Sheilesh
 G. Kavita as Sandhyarani
 Rajkumar Jnaranjan as Rajen, Sandhyarani's brother
 Jugeshwari as Bimola, Rajen's wife
 Randhoni as Sandhyarani's and Rajen's mother
 Romesh
 Shumila as Radharani, Sandhyarani's friend
 Mangsidam Binod
 Birjit Ngangomba
 Ibochouba Meetei
 Tamphamani
 Muhini
 Baby Dipa
 Ojit

Accolades
The movie won the National Film Award for Best Feature Film in Manipuri at the 48th National Film Awards. The citation for the National Award reads, "For narrating a complex love story in a simple manner and reflects the flavour of the land beautifully".

The film won the Best Feature Film and Best Director Awards at the 5th Manipur State Film Festival.

Soundtrack
Sagolsem Tijendra composed the soundtrack for the film.

External links

References

Meitei-language films
2000 films
Cinema of Manipur